Magnus Gustafsson was the defending champion, but lost in the first round to Tomas Nydahl.

Magnus Norman won the title by defeating Juan Antonio Marín 7–5, 6–2 in the final.

Seeds

Draw

Finals

Top half

Bottom half

References

External links
 Official results archive (ATP)
 Official results archive (ITF)

Singles
Swedish Open
Swed